The Order of Labour Glory (Russian: Орден Трудовой Славы) was a Soviet civilian award created on 18 January 1974 by the decision of the Presidium of Supreme Soviet of the USSR. Closely modelled on the Order of Glory, it was meant to be its civilian counterpart, awarded for exceptional labour achievements. In the same way as the Order of Glory, it was divided in three classes (the highest being the 1st class), with a person initially received the third degree, and subsequently promoted to higher degrees for further achievements. It also gave a certain number of material benefits to their owners, such as pension raises or free travel in city transports.

In 1991, the following number of awards were made:
 1st class – 983
 2nd class – 41,218
 3rd class – 611,242

Medals and ribbons

References 

 Great Soviet Encyclopedia, entry on "USSR Orders"
 Decision of the Presidium of Supreme Soviet of the USSR, dated 18 January 1974, compiled in ''Collection of legislative acts related to State Awards of the USSR", M. Izvestia, 1984.

Civil awards and decorations of the Soviet Union
Awards established in 1974
Awards disestablished in 1991
1991 disestablishments in the Soviet Union